Turbonilla puncta is a species of sea snail, a marine gastropod mollusk in the family Pyramidellidae, the pyrams and their allies.

Distribution
This species occurs in the following locations:
 Caribbean Sea
 Cayman Islands
 Colombia
 Gulf of Mexico
 Hispaniola
 Jamaica

References

External links
 To Biodiversity Heritage Library (8 publications)
 To Encyclopedia of Life
 To ITIS
 To World Register of Marine Species

puncta
Gastropods described in 1850